Parapalu is a village in Räpina Parish, Põlva County in eastern Estonia. Though parapula is also known as the bowl of water because almost 70% of the village is covered by water

References

 

Villages in Põlva County